Sandra Louise Maud Edlind Friberg (born Louise Edlind on 15 July 1946) is a Swedish actress, model and politician.

Acting career
As an actress she became popular as Malin Melkersson, the kind, warm and beautiful older sister in the popular 1964 children's TV series Vi på Saltkråkan, which frequently enjoys re-runs on Swedish television, and the subsequent Saltkråkan movies. The script for the series was written by Astrid Lindgren.

She got positive reviews for her part in the American film Le Mans in 1971, starring Steve McQueen. The same year she starred in the Swedish movie Lockfågeln. More recently, she had a major part in the soap opera Vänner och Fiender between 1996 and 1999.

Political work
Edlind Friberg is a politician for the Swedish Liberal People's Party. She was a substitute in the Riksdag from 2003, and on 1 January 2006 she became a full member of the parliament. She lost her seat in the Riksdag following the 2006 elections.

Filmography
Vi på Saltkråkan (1964, Sweden (TV series))
Tjorven, Båtsman och Moses (1964, Sweden)
Tjorven och Skrållan (1965, Sweden)
Tjorven och Mysak (1966, Sweden)
Skrållan, Ruskprick och Knorrhane (1967, Sweden)
Vi på Saltkråkan (1968, Sweden (movie version))
Lockfågeln (1971, Sweden)
Le Mans (1971, USA)
Vänner och fiender (1996-1999, Sweden (TV series))
Barnvakten (2007, Sweden (Short))
Morden i Sandhamn (2010, Sweden (TV series)
Psalm 21 (2010, Sweden)
Stugan i skuggan (2013, Sweden)
Quicksand (2019, Sweden)

External links
"Man blir ju ganska stämplad" (interview with Louise Edlind about 40 years of being identified with "Malin")

Louise Edlind Friberg at the Riksdag website

1946 births
Living people
Actresses from Stockholm
Swedish film actresses
Members of the Riksdag from the Liberals (Sweden)
Women members of the Riksdag
Members of the Riksdag 2002–2006
21st-century Swedish women politicians